At War with Reality is the fifth studio album and major label debut by Swedish melodic death metal band At the Gates, released on 28 October 2014. It is the band's first album since Slaughter of the Soul (1995), marking the longest gap between two studio albums in their career. It is a concept album based on the literary genre of magic realism. 

At War with Reality received positive reviews from music critics, and music videos were released for the songs "Death and the Labyrinth", "Heroes and Tombs", The Book of Sand (The Abomination)" and "The Night Eternal". The album is the band's last studio album to feature co-founding guitarist Anders Björler, who departed from the band in March 2017 but returned to the band in October 2022.

Background
After breaking up in 1996, At the Gates announced on 18 October 2007 that they would reunite for several reunion shows in the summer of 2008. Throughout July 2008, they toured the US and Canada on what was dubbed the "Suicidal Final Tour", and the last date of the tour took place in Athens, Greece, with guest The Ocean on 21 September 2008. Despite playing a handful of successful reunion shows, members of At the Gates stated that they would not record a new album, suggesting that it would be "pointless to release something more than ten years after Slaughter of the Soul."

After a two-year hiatus, At the Gates announced their second reunion in December 2010, and that they would do a "limited run of select shows" in 2011. They also announced that they would "stick to the initial promise of not making any more music." Asked in October 2012 about the possibility of new At the Gates material, frontman Tomas Lindberg replied, "Well, basically, I've learned never to say never. We said we'd never do any more shows whatsoever and now we're doing shows [again]. 2008 was the last tour we were going to do and now we are doing more [shows]. I learned not to say never you know."

On 21 January 2014, At the Gates released a distorted video on YouTube showing lines of lyrics on it, followed by text saying "2014", possibly hinting toward possible lyrics for an upcoming album. Six days later, the band revealed on Facebook via a new cover photo and profile picture, that they had signed to Century Media Records, and would begin recording their fifth album At War with Reality in June/July for a tentative October/November 2014 release.

On 14 August, the band announced they had completed the album and that it would be released on 28 October.

In a November 2014 interview, Lindberg was asked whether At War with Reality was At the Gates' final album or the band would continue recording. His response was, "We can't say really. We have no plans of stopping but we've broken promises before so it's best not to say anything."

The band concluded the At War with Reality world tour in August 2016, which had run for almost two years following its release.

The quote on the track "El altar del dios desconocido" is taken from the novel On Heroes and Tombs written by Argentine writer Ernesto Sabato.

Reception

Upon release, At War with Reality received universal acclaim. Ray Van Horn Jr. of Blabbermouth.net rated the album eight-and-a-half stars out of ten, and called it "probably the most anticipated metal album" of 2014. He finished his review by saying that, "At the Gates make mincemeat out of this album and efficiently plot most of their songs to wrap in far less time than their acolytes. The average song on At War with Reality clocks in between two-and-a-half and four minutes, yet all feel like far more has transcended. That's something special. Inadvertently and unfairly credited for the ascension of metalcore, At the Gates releases a demonstrative comeback album that's simply metal, forget the 'core-rellations."

At War with Reality was At the Gates' first album to chart in multiple countries. It peaked at number three on the Swedish chart Sverigetopplistan and reached number 53 on the US Billboard 200.

Track listing

Personnel
Credits are adapted from the album's liner notes.

At the Gates
 Tomas Lindberg – vocals
 Anders Björler – guitar
 Martin Larsson – guitar
 Jonas Björler – bass
 Adrian Erlandsson – drums

Production
 Costin Chioreanu – artwork, design
 Jens Bogren – mixing, mastering
 Fredrik Nordström – producer, recording, engineering
 Henrik Udd – recording, engineering
 Johan Henriksson – recording, editing

El Altar del Dios Desconocido
 Anton Reisenegger – spoken word
 Danny Biggin – recording
 Charlie Storm – mixing

Charts

References

2014 albums
At the Gates albums
Century Media Records albums
Concept albums